Ruby Range may refer to the following mountain ranges:

Ruby Range (Valhalla Ranges), British Columbia, Canada
Ruby Range (Sifton Ranges), British Columbia, Canada
Ruby Range (Yukon), Canada
Ruby Range (Colorado), United States
Ruby Range (Montana), United States

See also
Ruby Mountains